Kamay may refer to:

 Abot Kamay, album
 Kamay, Texas
 Kamay Botany Bay National Park, Sydney

See also 
 Kamai (disambiguation)